Agelena limbata is a species of spider in the family Agelenidae. It was described by Tamerlan Thorell in 1897. It is found in Myanmar, Laos, China, and Taiwan.

References

limbata
Spiders of Asia
Spiders of Taiwan
Spiders described in 1897
Taxa named by Tamerlan Thorell